is a Japanese actress. She won the award for best supporting actress at the 7th Yokohama Film Festival for Kanashii kibun de joke.

Filmography
 Rhyme of Vengeance (1978)
 Byoinzaka no Kubikukuri no Ie (1979)
 Conquest (1982)
 Theater of Life (1983)
 Hissatsu: Sure Death (1984)
 Kanashii kibun de joke (1985)

Television
 Kawaite sōrō (1984) as Fuki

References

1957 births
Living people
Actresses from Tokyo